Alexandros Gargalatzidis (born 12 April 2000) is a Greek professional footballer who plays as a forward for Super League 2 club Proodeftiki.

Career
The former OFI striker, Alexandros Gargalatzidis, became the first Greek to score in the newly formed Europa Conference League, as in last minute he scored against Valmiera FC. On 2 July 2021, he also scored in his A Lyga' s debut with his club against FK Banga Gargždai with a goal in 89 '.

References

2000 births
Living people
Greek footballers
Greece under-21 international footballers
Greece youth international footballers
Super League Greece players
PAOK FC players
Xanthi F.C. players
OFI Crete F.C. players
Association football forwards
Footballers from Thessaloniki